Cara Black and Liezel Huber were the two-time defending champions but did not compete together. Black partnered up with Lisa Raymond and Huber with Bethanie Mattek-Sands. Black and Raymond won in the final after Huber and Mattek-Sands retired.

Seeds

Draw

Draw

References
 2010 DFS Classic Draws
 ITF Tournament Page
 ITF doubles results page

Aegon Classic - Doubles
Doubles
Aegon Classic - Doubles